Justin Hill is an American baseball coach and former player, who is the current head baseball coach of the McNeese Cowboys. He was named to that position prior to the 2014 season.

Hill played at Mississippi Delta Community College and Bossier Parish Community College, then completed his final two years of eligibility at LSU, winning a pair of regionals with the Tigers.  He then began his coaching career as an assistant at West Monroe High School before moving up to Northwestern State.  After two seasons, he spent on year at LSU before moving to Sam Houston State for one year.  Hill was next named Associate Head Coach at Southeastern Louisiana, where he served for four seasons.  In 2012, he moved to the same position at Louisiana–Monroe.  In June 2014, he was named to his first head coaching position at McNeese State.

Head coaching record
Below is a table of Hill's yearly records as an NCAA head baseball coach.

See also
List of current NCAA Division I baseball coaches

References

Living people
People from West Monroe, Louisiana
High school baseball coaches in the United States
Mississippi Delta Trojans baseball players
Louisiana–Monroe Warhawks baseball coaches
LSU Tigers baseball coaches
LSU Tigers baseball players
McNeese Cowboys baseball coaches
Northwestern State Demons baseball coaches
Sam Houston Bearkats baseball coaches
Southeastern Louisiana Lions baseball coaches
Bossier Parish Cavaliers baseball players
Year of birth missing (living people)
Northwestern State University alumni
West Monroe High School alumni
Baseball coaches from Louisiana